The portrayal of men and women in video games, as in other media, is a subject of research in gender studies and is discussed in the context of sexism in video gaming.

Although women make up about half of video game players, they are significantly underrepresented as characters in mainstream games, despite the prominence of iconic heroines such as Samus Aran or Lara Croft. The portrayal of women in games often reflects traditional gender roles, sexual objectification, or stereotypes such as that of the "damsel in distress". Male characters are often stereotypically depicted as big and muscular, and LGBT characters have been slow to appear in video games as a result of the heteronormativity of the medium.

Research indicates that how genders are portrayed in games can influence players' perception of gender roles, and that young girls prefer to play a character of their own gender much more than boys do.  On average, female-led games sell fewer copies than male-led ones, but also have lower marketing budgets.

Gamer demographics 

A 2008 Gallup poll indicated that men and women each make up half of all American video game players. In 2014 in the UK and in Spain, women comprised 52% and 48% of video game players respectively. According to a 2008 study by the Pew Research Center, "Fully 99% of boys and 94% of girls play videogames."

Both men and women play video games, but studies suggest differences in platform and game genre preference. The Entertainment Software Rating Board reports that in 2010, 80% of female console gamers played on Wii, 11% on Xbox 360 and 9% on the PlayStation 3. By comparison, 38% of male console gamers in the year 2014 played the Xbox 360, 41% played the Wii and 21% played the PlayStation 3.

A 2013 study by Flurry looked at the different mobile gaming preferences between men and women. Women made up 60–80% of the solitaire, slots, social turn-based, match-three / bubble-shooter, management / simulation and quiz game markets. By contrast, men made up between 60 and 80% of the strategy, shooter, card battle, racing and action RPG markets.

A 2014 SuperData Research study found that men and women enjoy video games, but some genres are attracting one gender more than the other: Women compose 57.8 percent of the mobile market, 53.6 percent of the RPG market and 50.2 percent of the PC market (including social games). The study found that men make up 66 percent of MMO players, 66 percent of FPS players and 63 percent of digital console players.

On average, female-led games sell fewer copies than male-led ones, but also have lower marketing budgets. It is important to test the conditions under which gender representation predicts game sales. Adolescents who played video games frequently showed decreased concern about the effects that games with negatively stereotyped images may have on the players' attitudes compared to adolescents who played games infrequently or not at all. Those who play video games frequently compared to those who don't have different views when it comes to an opinion on gender representation in the video games they play.

Portrayal of women

As player characters

Prevalence

Playable female characters were found to appear less frequently than male characters in reviews for popular games in a 2006 study from Virginia Polytechnic Institute and State University. A 2007 study by Melinda C. R. Burgess et al. found that men are featured much more often than women on the covers of console video games.

In a sample of 669 action, shooter, and role-playing games selected by EEDAR in 2012, 300 (45%) provided the option of playing as a female, but only 24 (4%) had an exclusively female protagonist. EEDAR found in 2010 that 10% of games had a protagonist with an indiscernible gender. Downs and Smith (2010) analyzed the top 20 bestselling games in the US in 2003, finding that only 14% of characters were female.

According to Madeline Messer writing in The Washington Post in 2015, among the top 50 endless running games for mobile devices, 98% of those with gender-identifiable characters featured male protagonists, of which 90% were free to play. As many as 46% of these games offered female characters, and only 15% offered them for free. Playing as a girl required, on average, an additional purchase of $7.53, much more than the games themselves cost.

Evolution
Namco's arcade video game Pac-Man (1980), while starring a male protagonist, was "the first commercial videogame to involve large numbers of women" as players. The game's popularity among women led to the game's North American distributor, Midway Games, developing a sequel Ms. Pac-Man (1982) starring a female protagonist as their "way of thanking all those lady arcaders who have played and enjoyed Pac-Man." There was an earlier arcade game representing female characters, Exidy's arcade game Score (1977), but no screenshots of the game are known to be available.

Samus Aran, the heroine of Metroid (1986) and its successors, is often cited as "the first playable human female character in a mainstream video game". There were several earlier less-popular video games with playable human female characters, including Billie Sue from Wabbit (1982), Becky from Otenba Becky no Daibouken (1983), Lilly from Lilly Adventure (1983), Barbie (1984), 's  (1984), Papri from Girl's Garden (1984), Jenny from Jenny of the Prairie (1984), Toby Masuyo ("Kissy") from Baraduke (1985), Kurumi-Hime from Ninja Princess (1985), Flashgal (1985), Alexandra from Lode Runner's Rescue (1985), Athena (1986), Chris from Alpha (1986), Ki from The Return of Ishtar (1986), and Valkyrie from Valkyrie no Bōken (1986).

Studies of the prevalence of female characters in video games began to be conducted in sociological, educational, and cultural journals as early as the late 1970s and early 1980s. In 1979, researchers publishing in The Psychological Record (Vol.29, No.1. Pp. 43–48) concluded from the results of a 201-person survey that 90% of male subjects and 85% of female subjects perceived the computer as masculine (in gameplay versus the computer). In 1983, professor Sara Kiesler et al. published a study in Psychology Today (Vol.17, No.3. Pp. 40–48.) finding that female characters appeared in video games at a frequency of 1 game in 7. Elizabeth Behm-Morawitz suggested that the reduced presence of female characters implies a secondary status for women in video games and also suggesting playable female characters do appear in video games, they are more often scantily dressed and oversexualized than men.

In 1994, Australian Hyper magazine writer Virginia Barratt accused the video game industry of being sexist for the lack of female representation, stating video games "are made by boys for boys who play with other boys" and girls "rarely get a look in, unless of course there's a victim who needs to be rescued or someone needs to wear a bikini to cheer the macho men on." She also said that many female players, despite enjoying popular arcade games such as Street Fighter II and Mortal Kombat, were discouraged from visiting arcades due to being male-dominated spaces.

Lara Croft, the protagonist of Tomb Raider (1996), is among the best-known strong, fictional women in a variety of media. Since her introduction in 1996, the character of Croft has been criticized for her "unrealistic" breast size; Lara was claimed to personify "an ongoing culture clash over gender, sexuality, empowerment, and objectification." In a 2008 Tomb Raider title, Croft was depicted in "hot pants and midriffs" and was said to look like she was "dressed by a male". However, the game's creators maintain that she was not designed with marketing in mind, and have claimed to be rather surprised at her pinup-style adoration. In Tomb Raider: Legend, Lara underwent a radical redesign, ostensibly to make her less sexualized.

April Ryan from The Longest Journey (1999) has been compared to Lara Croft, as she shows less prominent physical feminine attributes than Lara but more feminine psychological traits, as contrasted with Lara's masculine connotations like aggressiveness and force. Contrarily, Jade, the protagonist of Beyond Good & Evil (2003), was widely recognized as a strong and confident female character lacking any overt sexualisation.

The year 2013 featured women in leading roles in a number of award-winning games such as The Last of Us (2013), Bioshock Infinite (2013), the rebooted Tomb Raider (2013), and Beyond: Two Souls (2013). A study of these games found that although the leading female characters in these games were able to subvert predominant gender stereotypes, women were still limited by men in the narratives, in particular through benevolent sexism.

In 2014, the developers' choice to omit playable women in the latest iterations of the top-tier gaming franchises Assassin's Creed and Far Cry became a focus of discussions in gaming media. This indicated, according to game industry professionals cited by Polygon, a shift in the industry's attention towards issues of diversity in gaming, in conjunction with video games as a whole growing beyond their former core audience of younger men.

The announcement trailer for Battlefield V in 2018 was met with backlash from some fans of the series, who took issue with the potential portrayal of women in the game. Their main point of contention was with the British woman featured in the trailer, citing the character's presence as unrealistic due to women on the British side never participating in frontline combat during World War II and being mostly relegated to supporting roles.

As supporting characters
Female characters are often cast in the role of the damsel in distress, with their rescue being the objective of the game. Princess Zelda in the early The Legend of Zelda series, the Sultan's daughter in Prince of Persia, and Princess Peach through much of the Mario series are paradigmatic examples. By 2013, Peach appeared in 14 of the main Super Mario games and was kidnapped in 13 of them. The only main games that Peach was not kidnapped in were in the North America release of Super Mario 2 and Super Mario 3D World, but she was a character that can be played. Zelda became playable in some later games of The Legend of Zelda series or had the pattern altered. Shanon Sherman described how the illustrations on video game covers portrayed women in need of rescue. She wrote that these covers reinforce the existing gender stereotypes and sexual discrimination against women.

A number of games feature a female character as an ally or sidekick to the male hero. Some of them, like Ada Wong of Resident Evil and Mona Sax of Max Payne, were turned into player characters in later instances of their series. Alyx Vance, a supporting protagonist of Half-Life 2, was praised for her "stinging personality" and intelligence, developing a close bond with the player without simply being "eye candy".

In 1998, Michigan State University analyzed 33 popular games for the Nintendo and Sega Genesis consoles. Collected data shows that only 15% of games had a female role as a protagonist or an active character. In 41% of games, there were simply no female characters, and in the rest they were assigned the role of victims or sexual objects.

Jeroen Jannsz and Raynel G. Martis conducted research on the representation of gender within video games and of the 12 games that were examined, there were 22 characters to look at. Two games did not have a second or supporting character in the intro cutscene: Splinter Cell focused exclusively on protagonist Sam Fisher, and Tomb Raider: Angel of Darkness focused exclusively on Lara Croft. The analysis showed a dominance of male characters in the games. Thirteen of 22 game characters (about 60%) were men. Among the leading characters there was an equal gender distribution (six men; six women), but supporting characters turned out to be seven men (70%) and three women (30%). A difference appeared between characters who had a leading part in the game and those in a supporting role. Jannsz and Martis stated that there is a depiction of a lead role being in a commanding position and the narrative being about them. This is consistent with masculinized traits such as leadership and independence that may be given to female characters along with sexualized attributes so they are "sexy" and appealing.

As antagonists
One of the first major female villains in video games was the Dark Queen in Battletoads (1991) and its sequels. SHODAN, an artificial intelligence with a female voice and a female face, was the main villain of the game System Shock (1994), praised as one of the most recognizable female characters in gaming. Another prominent classic female villain is Ultimecia, the main antagonist in Final Fantasy VIII (1999). Similarly, GLaDOS from Portal (2007), an insane computer with a female voice, was praised by critics as one of the best new characters of the 2000s.

Sexualization

The portrayal of women in video games has been the subject of academic study and controversy since the early 1980s. Recurring themes in articles and discussions on the topic include the sexual objectification and sexualization of female characters, done to appeal to a presumed male audience, as well as the degree to which female characters are independent from their male counterparts within the same game. The sexualization of women involves the use of female bodies in a way that renders them the object of a sexual gaze or perception by others; their bodies are objectified and they are reduced to that of a sex object. Research on exposure to sexualized media representations of women in television and magazines has asked whether it reduces male compassion toward women, and reduces women's perceptions of their desire and suitability for various vocations.

Prevalence
In their 2005 study, Karen E. Dill and K. P. Thill distinguish three major stereotypical depictions of women in gaming: (1) sexualized, (2) scantily clad, and (3) a vision of beauty. The study revealed that over 80% of women in video games represented one of these depictions. More than one quarter of female characters embodied all of the three stereotypical categories at once. Dill and Thill also note that another prevalent theme with which women were depicted was a combination of aggression and sex, referred to as "eroticized aggression". According to sociology professor and researcher Tracy Dietz, women are often depicted in stereotypical roles that typically pertain to sexuality in which the woman focuses upon beauty/physical attractiveness. According to an analysis conducted by Downs and Smith, playable and plot relevant characters in the 60 best selling video games of 2003 were predominantly male. Females who were depicted were frequently sexualized. The female characters analyzed were depicted partially naked or with unrealistic proportions more often than the male characters were. A study of 225 video game covers found that both male and female character's physiques were overexaggerated, but women were more "physically altered" (especially in the bust) than their male counterparts, and even more so if the female was the main character of the game. Downs and Smith (2010) found that 41% of female video game characters appeared in sexually revealing clothing, and 43% were designed as partially or fully naked. Female characters were also more likely to be designed with unrealistic body proportions than male characters (25% vs 2%).

A 2011 study regarding gender Identity and representation in Digital RPGs found that hyper-sexuality, which is often associated with female avatars, tends to negatively affect numerous types of gamers, who deeply identify with their avatar. The study found that this issue reifies the idea that "a woman's power, in-game or out, comes entirely from her sexuality".

However, a 2016 study of 571 games released between 1984 and 2014 found that the sexualization of female characters was at its height between 1990 and 2005, and then began to significantly decline. It also determined that there was no significant difference in sexualization between games rated as "Teen" (for ages 13 and up) and "Mature" (17 and up) by the ESRB, indicating that sexualized women in games are so prevalent that they are not thought of as objectionable to children. Less sexualization was found in RPGs, which are played more often by women, than in action and fighting games.

Forms

Many early female video game characters (such as Ms. Pac-Man) are identical to an existing male character, except for a visual marker of their femininity, such as pink bows, lipstick and long eyelashes.

Female video game characters have been criticized as having a tendency to be subjects of the "male gaze". A print ad for the fighting game Soulcalibur V received some controversy for simply being a close up of female character Ivy Valentine's breasts with a tagline. In two sequels of fighting games Soulcalibur and Tekken that take place several years after the original issue, recurring male characters were all aged but all female characters were kept the same age or were replaced by their daughters. Many games, particularly fighting games, also feature pronounced "breast physics", which make the breasts of female characters bounce or jiggle in a sometimes exaggerated manner.

A recurrent representation of women in fantasy settings, originating in the 1960s, is the female warrior dressed in scanty armor. They feature armor designs which have been described by such terms as "chainmail bikinis", largely consisting of small decorative plaques that reveal large portions of the body to the weather and expose vital organs, making them ineffective as protection. Such depictions are an instance of the general sexualization of women in geek culture, including in video games, comic and movies. In reaction to this, the art blog "Women Fighters in Reasonable Armor" compiles depictions of women fighters wearing "realistic" armor.

Violence against women
Video games have been criticized for depicting violence against women. For example, the 2013 game Dead Island: Riptide generated controversy when the special "zombie bait" edition of the game included a statue of a torso of a busty, dismembered woman in a skimpy bikini. While much of the Grand Theft Auto franchise has had issues with claims of violence against women, Rockstar North's Grand Theft Auto V was also surrounded in much criticism; so much so that Target Australia withdrew the game from sale.

The 1982 game Custer's Revenge was first noted for containing elements of rape and some Native American groups and the National Organization for Women have criticised this as well as alleged racism. Kotaku described the 2013 reboot of Tomb Raider as using rape for Lara Croft's character development; the developers denied that the scene depicted an attempted rape.

Portrayal of men
Men are also often portrayed stereotypically in games. A recurring depiction of male sexuality is the power fantasy, where an apparent sexualization as an object of desire and hypermasculinity are overruled by the character's agency as the protagonist and  avatar for the player's power within the game world.

Stereotyping and violence
Men in games tend to be shown as muscular and big. For instance, men in video games have chests that are about 2 inches (6%) larger, heads that are about 13 inches bigger, waists that are 5 inches wider, and hips that are 7 inches wider, than in reality. They are often characterized as overtly aggressive and violent. Following the releases of Grand Theft Auto V, the developers were met with criticism regarding both the portrayal of women and torture, but also that of men. Two of the main characters, Trevor Philips and Michael De Santa, have since been interpreted by some as portraying men as "liars, cheats, bad husbands and fathers, and psychopaths".

GamesRadar writer David Houghton, writing in an article on sexism in video games, was highly critical of many stereotypes that came with male protagonists, outlining them as "the primeval hunter/gatherer type [with] arm-cripplingly ripped biceps, necks too muscley to turn, emotion dials stuck on 'aggressive grimace' and a 50% lack of chest coverings".

Jamin Warren on PBS Game/Show highlighted that video games could promote "unreasonable body expectations, or an inability to express emotion, or the pressure to 'man up' and be a leader". He also highlighted that the vast majority of characters who perform and experience violence in video games are men, while women and children are generally to be protected.

Sexualization of men
The sexualization of men in video games is connected to the male gaze, which is the act of depicting women and the world, in the visual arts and in literature, from a masculine, heterosexual perspective that presents and represents women as sexual objects for the pleasure of the male viewer.

It has been noted that while video games tend to sexualize women more often than men, male characters are also sexualized in games. However, the sexualization of men isn't as prevalent as that of women. Furthermore, it's also been noted that while female characters' sexualization is done as fan service and treats them as objects, the sexualization of male characters is done as a male power fantasy. Commenting on this topic, The Guardian Keith Stuart argues that while female characters are presented as sex objects, male characters are usually portrayed as something for straight male gamers to aspire towards. Writing for Paste magazine, Dante Douglas argued that men's sexualization and sexuality in video games falls in one of three categories: power fantasy, gender performance, and fan interpretation, with the power fantasy type being the most prevalent out of the three.

Video game designer and industry activist Mattie Brice, writing for PopMatters, argues that a notable aspect of sexual objectification involves "emphasizing what is illegal/improper to show in public without crossing a line". For women, these would include drawing attention to their breasts. However, drawing attention to a man's chest isn't viewed as improper, and thus, while male video game characters that act as power fantasies may have an exposed chest, they don't qualify as sex objects, or their portrayal as sexualization. Brice goes on to state that true sexualization of men characters in video games would entail emphasizing what is improper for men to show in public; having them wear "low-rise pants and underwear" and drawing attention to their bulge or butts.

According to a study conducted by Karen Dill and Kathryn P. Thill in 2005, around 39% of female characters in video games wear revealing clothes, versus 8% of male characters. Moreover, only 1% of male characters have "sexualized figures", compared to 60% of female characters. The study also stated that male characters (83%) are more likely to be portrayed as aggressive than female characters (62%), holding that men are included within the stereotyping image of video game marketing.

Men as power fantasies
Like female characters, male characters in video games often have unrealistic body proportions, with "perfectly chiseled bodies and rippling muscles". This portrayal of men and their bodies, described as the "ideal hero form", has its roots in American superhero comics. However, this isn't done to turn them into sex objects, but rather showcase how they are "powerful and strong".

Regarding power fantasy, Douglas states that this is most prevalent form of male sexualization in video games, describing it as the "Muscle-Bound Warrior Man". He points out that Kratos from the God of War franchise is a prominent example. One of the main reasons Kratos and other examples of the power fantasy are different from female sexualized characters is that they have agency. Their sexual exploits are not made for sexual arousal, but serve as avatars for the straight male gamers to showcase their strength through "conque[st]". These characters are characterized by their hypermasculinity.

Men as sexual objects
Brice argues that the main reason male characters aren't sexualized as often as female characters is because many video games—and by extension, other media—are developed by heterosexual men, with the "neutral vision of game design" being influenced by the "socially appropriate interests specific to straight men". Since the "average straight guy avoid[s] appearing or feeling gay", male characters in game are usually not sexualized; the little sexualization that does occur, such as bare arms or an exposed chest, is done because it's viewed as "safe" for straight men.

When men are sexualized in a similar manner to women, this is usually done for comedic effect. Examples include the video game franchise Cho Aniki and Muscle March which feature men in sexualized and homoerotic poses. However, this is done as part of the game's absurd humor, rather than as true sexualization. 

Regarding the treatment of men as sex objects, which he calls "gender performance", Douglas notes that due to the prevailing heteronormativity in video games, attributing "sexiness" to a character is intertwined with femininity. Because being sexy is also viewed as being submissive, this contrasts with the masculine ideal of being in control. For this reason, many male video game characters that are characterized as "sexy" and objects of desire are coded by including feminine traits; their vanity and attention to personal attire, and queer coding, usually for humorous purposes.

Bishōnen
Male characters with distinctly feminine traits often appear in East Asian video games, especially Japanese video games, as the Bishōnen archetype. These men distinguish themselves by grace and charm.

Examples
Chris Redfield, a prominent character in the Resident Evil franchise since the first game, had his appearance changed radically for Resident Evil 5 (2009), which included increased muscle mass. His redesign has been noted for being sexy, with the character described as a "beefcake". The Microsoft Windows release of the game included an alternate "Warrior" outfit for Chris, which has been described as a Mad Max-esque and "BDSM fetishi[sm]". For the updated HD version of Resident Evil: Revelations (2012), released in 2013, Chris was given an unlockable "Sailor" outfit which the game's writer Dai Satō describes as having "the shirt [be] a super tight fit" and includes "short trousers". According to artist Satoshi Takamatsu, the developers always have "difficulties with Chris' bonus costumes", but decided to use the Sailor one because it differed greatly from his normal outfit from the game. Chris' Sailor outfit received some positive responses, with South African website Game Zone describing it as "sexy" and that it makes him look like a member of the Village People. American horror website Bloody Disgusting, despite considering the Sailor Chris outfit one of the franchise's "silliest" costumes, also acknowledges its sex appeal. with IGN echoing similar statements.

Attention regarding male sexualization in video games has also been given to Kaidan Alenko from BioWare's Mass Effect series; especially his portrayal and potential romance in Mass Effect 3 (2012). In Chapter 1 of the book Digital Love: Romance and Sexuality in Games, Michelle Clough presented a case study which illustrated how the character is an example of the shifting portrayal of male sexualization in the original trilogy. While Kaidan is presented as a love interest for a female Shepard who is conventionally attractive and has an appealing personality in the first game, she noted that there was little acknowledgment of the physical aspect of his appeal, and outside of a sex scene which mostly focuses on a female Shepard's body, little opportunity for the character to be appreciated in a sexual context. This is contrasted with Kaidan's more sexualized presentation in Mass Effect 3, where the character is shirtless in multiple scenes, and more emphasis is placed on the intimacy between him and Shepard. During one scene where Kaidan is reboarding the Normandy and still in a relationship with Shepard, the camera alternates quick cuts between a close up of Kaidan's buttocks and a close up of Shepard's gaze, indicating that she enjoys looking at him in a sexual way. Clough concluded that Kaidan's overall depiction in 3 framed him as a good choice for Shepard as a romantic and sexual partner.

Male sexualization within fandom
Lastly, there is fan interpretation, where Douglas notes that some male characters, despite not adhering to the masculine physical ideal are still viewed as attractive by the fanbase. These male characters tend to be more open with their emotions, and are usually suave. Characters such as this—like Garrus Vakarian from the Mass Effect series—are usually side characters, rather than the player character. Fan interpretation is characterize by the male character's limitations and interactions with other characters within the story.

Portrayal of LGBT characters

LGBT (lesbian, gay, bisexual or transgender) characters have been included in video games as early as the 1980s and 1990s. While there has been a trend towards greater representation of LGBT people in video games, they are frequently identified as LGBT in secondary material, such as comics, rather than in the games themselves.

In the history of video games, LGBT content has been subject to changing rules and regulations, which are generally examples of heterosexism, in that heterosexuality is normalized, while homosexuality is subject to additional censorship or ridicule. Companies Nintendo of America, Sega of America and Maxis policed the content of games with content codes in which LGBT themes were toned down or erased. Some Japanese video games, for instance, originally included trans characters, such as Birdo from Super Mario Bros. 2, Poison from the Final Fight series, and Flea from Chrono Trigger. Due to adherence to Nintendo of America's quality standards and translations based on preserving gameplay rather than literal meaning, these characters' identities were altered or erased in translation.

The video game industry is regarded as having heteronormative bias by numerous analysts. According to industry professionals interviewed by Shaw, reasons for this heteronormativity include the demographic of those who play games, the views of those who create games, the risk of backlash in the industry, and the storytelling limitations of the medium.

Choice-based LGBT content, such as optional same sex romance in BioWare games, is a low- risk form of representation that occurs only in video games.  When representation is included, it is often through these in-game choices, which place the responsibility for representation on players instead of developers. Because they afford the most opportunity for player choice and in game romance, genres such as RPGs and MMOs are the most LGBT representative. Another low risk method of LGBT representation is "Gay window gaming," which is LGBT representation that is either subtle or avoidable in games that serves to appeal to LGBT players without alienating straight or homophobic players. This can occur in sandbox games such as The Sims.

In games with LGBT characters or the option of an LGBT avatar, some aspects of marginalization that occur in contemporary culture are depicted despite the game's overall adherence to reality. These real social constraints are imposed on a virtual world due to the way games are constructed and the community that inhabits them. Games are made on contemporary culture's heteronormative basis, and this shapes narrative and characters. In the popular MMO World of Warcraft, for example, this has "created an oppressive atmosphere for individuals who do not adhere to a heteronormative lifestyle", according to a 2013 assessment of the game's community.

Both members of the industry and LGBT players prefer LGBT representation to be normalized in game narratives rather than made to seem abnormal or special.

LGBT gamers use queer readings of media to compensate for their lack of representation in it. As concluded in a study by Moravec, this "imaginative play" is the most common method LGBT gamers use to relate to in game avatars that are typically created for a presumed straight male player to relate to.

Sexual orientation and gender identity have served a significant role in some video games, with the trend being toward greater visibility of LGBT identities. Speaking on the Ubisoft blog, Lucien Soulban, who is openly gay and was the writer for Far Cry 3: Blood Dragon, said that openly gay or lesbian characters would not appear in video games for a long while as anything other than a one-off or something that was created through user choice as seen in the Mass Effect and Dragon Age games. The character of Dorian Pavus in Dragon Age: Inquisition was regarded as a significant development for the portrayal of gay characters in games, in that his homosexuality informs plot elements that occur regardless of whether the player decides to interact with him romantically.

With more video games featuring themes related to LGBT characters and themes, the Gay & Lesbian Alliance Against Defamation (GLAAD) included a video game awards category, the "Outstanding Video Game Award" for games with "outstanding LGBTQ-inclusive content", starting in its 30th GLAAD Media Awards.

Effect of gender representation in games

Effect on attitudes towards gender 
A 2008 study found that males reported playing more violent video games than females. This exposure was negatively correlated with men's certainty in their judgements when presented with a scenario of possible sexual harassment selected for its ambiguity. The exposure to violent video games was also correlated with attitudes supportive of rape.

Effect on children
Canadian non-profit MediaSmarts writes that "video games have the potential to influence how children perceive themselves and others", and despite their impact on the youth, "there is not a lot of research available in this area, and few of the existing studies stand up to critical examination. This lack of scrutiny means that we know very little about the effects that video games may have on children's development and socialization."

According to Dietz, video game characters have the potential to shape players' perceptions of gender roles. Through social comparison processes, players learn societal expectations of appearances, behaviors and roles. Girls may expect that they be dependent victims and that their responsibilities include maintaining beauty and sexual appeal, while boys may determine that their role is to protect and defend women. Thus, Dietz claims, the roles internalized by the child, including gender, become for the child, and later for the adult, a basis for other roles and for action. The gender roles internalized by young individuals have a significant impact upon their perspectives and the additional roles they assume in later life. Feminine and masculine symbols are supposed to become a part of a child's identity.

Effects of sexualized content on players
A 2022 meta-analysis examined empirical evidence of whether or not sexualized content in video games correlated with body dissatisfaction, or if it resulted in more sexist or misogynistic behavior. It found that neither body dissatisfaction or sexist/misogynistic behavior correlated with sexualized content in video games. The study also determined that the better the study was designed, the less of a correlation was present.

Players' preferences
Although games that included the option of selecting a female hero obtained better review scores, they sold fewer copies than games with exclusively male protagonists. Penny Arcade Report attributed the difference to larger marketing budgets for games with male heroes. Games with a female-only protagonist had, on average, only 50% of the marketing budget of female-optional games, and 40% of the marketing budget of games with male-only protagonists. Male-only games included popular sports and war franchises such as Madden NFL and Call of Duty, and EEDAR's Jesse Divnich stated in 2010, "The factors that drive sales are based more on brand licensing, marketing budgets, development budget and a thousand other factors that have little to do with the gender of playable avatars."

A 2013 study showed that box art depicting sexualized female characters in non-central roles positively affected sales.

Polling in 2015 by the Pew Research Center showed 16% of adults who play video games believe most games portray women poorly, compared to 26% who disagree, and 34% who say it depends on the game. Among those who do not play, 55% are unsure if games portray women poorly. Minimal differences were seen between male and female responses.

A 2015 survey of 1,583 U.S. students aged 11 to 18 by Rosalind Wiseman and Ashly Burch indicated that 60% of girls but only 39% of boys preferred to play a character of their own gender, and 28% of girls as opposed to 20% of boys said that they were more likely to play a game based on the character's gender. The authors interpreted this as meaning that the gaming industry's focus on male protagonists stifled sales to girls more than it promoted sales to boys.

In a 2017 survey of 1,266 gamers by Quantic Foundry, 89% of female gamers considered the inclusion of female protagonist option in games somewhat, very or extremely important; 64% of male gamers expressed the same views. Self-identified "hardcore" gamers of both genders, on average, considered a female protagonist less important than "core" or "casual" gamers did.

2000s quantitative overview 
This section provides an overview of the findings of the quantitative results of various studies into gender representation in video games during the 2000s.

See also

Gamergate controversy, concerning harassment towards people discussing gender issues in gaming.
Media and gender
Portrayal of women in American comics
Sex and nudity in video games
Sexual harassment in video gaming

References

Bibliography

Further reading

Gender and video games
Mass media issues
Women and video games